The 1956 Roller Hockey World Cup was the twelfth roller hockey world cup, organized by the Fédération Internationale de Patinage a Roulettes (now under the name of Fédération Internationale de Roller Sports). It was contested by 11 national teams (10 from Europe and 1 from South America) and it is also considered the 1956 European Roller Hockey Championship (despite the presence of Brazil). All the games were played in the city of Porto, in Portugal, the chosen city to host the World Cup.

Results

Standings

See also
 FIRS Roller Hockey World Cup
 CERH European Roller Hockey Championship

External links
 1956 World Cup in rink-hockey.net historical database

Roller Hockey World Cup
International roller hockey competitions hosted by Portugal
1956 in Portuguese sport
1956 in roller hockey